Vamsee Juluri (born 1969) is a professor of media studies at the University of San Francisco.

Career 
Juluri was born in Hyderabad in 1969.  His mother is the Telugu film actress Jamuna, and his father was Juluri Ramana Rao, a professor of zoology.  Juluri studied at the University of Massachusetts Amherst and received a PhD in 1999. He has written for several publications including Times of India, Huffington Post, and The Indian Express. His research interest is in the globalization of media audiences with an emphasis on Indian television and cinema, mythology, religion, violence and Gandhian philosophy. He has published several papers and essays analyzing recurring themes in Bollywood, such as tradition and violence.

Juluri was the lead petitioner in the effort by academics of Indian origin against efforts to address the countries of historical British India as "South Asia" in textbooks put forth by the California Board of Education, (California textbook controversy over Hindu history). As a result of his efforts which became a mass movement led to review and dismissal of several changes to the History Social Science Frameworks (Syllabus).

Books

Essays
Becoming a Global Audience: Longing and Belonging in Indian Music Television, New York : Peter Lang, 2003, 155 p.
Bollywood Nation: India Through Its Cinema, New Delhi : Penguin Books India, 2013, 211 p.
Rearming Hinduism: Nature, Hinduphobia, and the Return of Indian Intelligence, Chennai : Westland ltd, 2015, 229 p.
Nine Days in Kishkindha: A Memoir about Hanuman, Hampi and My Father, Kindle Edition, 2018, 116 p.
Writing Across a Cracked World: Hindu Representation and the Logic of Narrative, Kindle Edition, 2018, 255 p.

Novels
The Mythologist, New Delhi : Penguin Books, 2010, 271 p.
Saraswati's Intelligence (The Kishkindha Chronicles, #1), Chennai : Westland Ltd., 2016, 327 p.
The Firekeepers of Jwalapuram (The Kishkindha Chronicles, #2), Kindle Edition, 2020, 328 p.

References 

1969 births
Living people
University of Massachusetts Amherst alumni
University of San Francisco faculty
American male writers of Indian descent
Hindu revivalist writers